Albert "Bob" Keeton (15 January 1918 – January 1996) was an English professional footballer.

Keeton, a Chesterfield-born right-back began his football career with Gainsborough Trinity, later joining Mosborough Trinity. In June 1937 he joined Torquay United, making his debut in a 1–0 win at home to Swindon Town on 26 February 1938. He lost his place to his former Mosborough teammate Freddie Green after playing the next game, a 1–0 defeat away to Aldershot, but after missing just one game re-emerged as a left-back, replacing Ernie Stokes. He finished his first season as a professional having made 11 league appearances and began the following season as the regular left-back. However, after playing the first 13 league games, he lost his place and was to only make a further 3 first-team appearances that season.

His career was interrupted by the war, but when league football resumed he was still with Torquay and was the regular right-back in Torquay's 1946-47 side. He left Torquay in 1948, having made 77 league appearances, and joined non-league Yeovil Town. In 1949 he was part of the famous Yeovil side that reached the 5th Round of the FA Cup, beating then giants Sunderland, including England star Len Shackleton who Keeton kept quiet throughout the game, in the 4th Round.

Keeton later worked as a commercial traveller in Torquay, and died of cancer in Torquay in January 1996.

References

1918 births
1996 deaths
Footballers from Chesterfield
English footballers
Torquay United F.C. players
English Football League players
Yeovil Town F.C. players
Association football defenders